Mithaq or Misaq is an Arabic, Persian and Urdu word meaning covenant.

Misaq in Fatimid tradition 
The Misaq or Mithaq, in Fatimid tradition, is considered a rite of passage from childhood to adulthood. Similar to a bar mitzvah, followers must be a certain age before taking the oath.

Dawoodi Bohras